Microhyla fusca (common names: brown rice frog or Dalat pigmy frog) is a species of frog in the family Microhylidae.
It is endemic to Vietnam: it is only known from its type locality, Da Lat on Lang Biang Plateau in southern Vietnam.
Its natural habitats are swamps, freshwater marshes, and intermittent freshwater marshes. Its status is insufficiently known.

References

fusca
Amphibians of Vietnam
Endemic fauna of Vietnam
Taxonomy articles created by Polbot
Amphibians described in 1942